Kisom (also Romanized as Kīsom; also known as Keysūm, Kīsūm, Kisum, and Pā’īn Maḩalleh-ye Kīsūm) is a village in Kisom Rural District, in the Central District of Astaneh-ye Ashrafiyeh County, Gilan Province, Iran. At the 2006 census, its population was 1,671, in 584 families.

References 

Populated places in Astaneh-ye Ashrafiyeh County